Pharmaniaga Berhad (Pharmaniaga) is a Malaysian pharmaceutical company. It is a subsidiary of Boustead Holdings, an affiliate of the Malaysian military.

History 
Pharmaniaga was established in 1994 as Remedi Pharmaceuticals. The company was renamed as Pharmaniaga in August 1998 and is the first healthcare company in Malaysia to be listed in the Main Market of Kuala Lumpur Stock Exchange (now Bursa Malaysia).

Ownership
Pharmaniaga is a public limited company. Its two major shareholders are  Boustead Holdings and Lembaga Tabung Angkatan Tentera (LTAT). The major owner of Boustead Holdings is itself LTAT.

The Company's Board Members  comprise Izaddeen Daud, Non-Independent Non-Executive Chairman, Dr Abdul Razak Ahmad, Senior Independent Non-Executive Director, YB Senator Datuk Dr. Haji Azhar Ahmad, Sarah Azreen Abdul Samat, Datuk Lim Thean Shiang and Dr Mary Jane Cardosa as Independent Non-Executive Directors, while Ahmad Shahredzuan Mohd Shariff is a Non-Independent Non-Executive Director.

On 14 March, Pharmaniaga has formed an executive committee (EXCO) in the interim, comprising  Ahmad Shahredzuan Mohd Shariff, Non-independent Non-Executive Director; Zulkifli Jafar, Deputy Chief Executive Officer; Mohamed Iqbal Abdul Rahman, Chief Operating Officer and Norai'ni Mohamed Ali, Chief Financial Officer.

Business Overview 
Pharmaniaga is involved in various segments of the pharmaceutical value chain, including research and development, manufacturing of generic drugs and medical devices, logistics and distribution, sales and marketing, as well as community pharmacy.

Pharmaniaga has over 3,600 employees, and more than 300 scientists, including researchers, chemists, pharmacologists, formulators, IT engineers, regulatory and clinical affairs specialists.

With eight manufacturing plants, Pharmaniaga is capable of producing products in various forms; from oral solids, liquids and creams to small volume injectables.  Its product portfolio encompasses a diverse segment of therapeutic areas such as cardiovascular, anti-diabetic, antibiotics, antivirals, over the counter products and nutraceuticals, amongst others.

Its Indonesia operations include two manufacturing plants and a public listed pharmaceutical logistics and distribution company with 33 branches throughout the republic.

References

Government-owned companies of Malaysia
Companies listed on Bursa Malaysia
Pharmaceutical companies of Malaysia
Pharmaceutical companies established in 1994
Companies based in Shah Alam
1994 establishments in Malaysia
Malaysian brands